Mario Guarnacci (October 25, 1701 in Volterra, Province of Pisa – August 21, 1785 in Volterra), was an Italian prelate, archeologist and historian. He was one of the first scholars to carry out systematic excavations of Etruscan tombs.

Biography 
Mario Guarnacci was born at Volterra of a noble and wealthy family. He received the doctor's degree at Florence, where he pursued the course of Anton Maria Salvini. He was honored with the favor of Pope Benedict XIV, who charged him to continue Alfonso Chacón's Lives of the Popes, but he retired in 1757 to his own country. He discovered there the remains of Roman baths. He also made a collection of Etruscan antiquities, which he bequeathed to his native city. The donation also included a rich library of more than  volumes. He died August 21, 1785. His most important work was Origini Italiche (1767), in which he maintained the chronological priority of the Etrusco-Pelasgians over the other peoples of Italy and Greece. According to Guarnacci, the Pelasgian-Tyrrhenians of Italy migrated in prehistoric times and brought an Italic culture to savage and uncouth Greece. Guarnacci's theories gave rise to a lively controversy involving several prominent historians and scholars of the period, such as Giovanni Lami, Scipione Maffei and Antonio Francesco Gori.

Works 

 Dissertazione sopra le XII Tavole (Florence, 1747);
 Vitae et Res Gestae Pontificum Romanorum, etc. (Rome, 1751);
 Origini Italiche (Volterra, 1768);
 Poesie di Zelalgo Arassiano (Lucca, 1769).

Bibliography

References 

Italian archaeologists
18th-century Italian historians
1701 births
1785 deaths